HD 24496 is a binary star system in the equatorial constellation of Taurus. The combined apparent visual magnitude of the pair is 6.81, which is too faint to be readily visible to the normal human eye. The system is located at a distance of 66.8 light years from the Sun based on parallax, and is drifting further away with a radial velocity of +19 km/s.

The magnitude 6.9 primary star, designated component A, is a G-type main-sequence star with a stellar classification of G7V. It is around three billion years old with a low projected rotational velocity. The star has 96% of the mass of the Sun and 91% of the Sun's radius. The metallicity, what astronomers term the abundance of heavier elements, is about the same as in the Sun. The star is radiating 71% of the luminosity of the Sun from its photosphere at an effective temperature of 5,572 K.

The secondary companion, component B, is a magnitude 11.1 red dwarf of class M2V that shares a common proper motion with the primary. Their orbital period is around 123,000 years.

References 

G-type main-sequence stars
M-type main-sequence stars
Binary stars
Taurus (constellation)
BD+16 0527
3255
024496
018267